Akimerus schaefferi is a long-horned beetle species (family (Cerambycidae). It belongs to the subfamily Lepturinae. This beetle is distributed in much of continental Europe, ranging from Iberia to Poland and Hungary, as well as in Bulgaria and Greece.

Systematics 
This species has two currently accepted subspecies, and two color morphs have been described in the nominate subspecies:
 Akimerus schaefferi schaefferi (Laicharting, 1784)
 Akimerus schaefferi schaefferi var. nigrinus Pic
 Akimerus schaefferi schaefferi var. renatae Ravalier & Barthe, 1956
 Akimerus schaefferi ariannae Perarini & Sabbadini, 2007

The latter is found only in Greece, while the former seems to occur everywhere in the species' range but probably not in Greece. The subspecies limits are not fully understood yet, and given the species' distribution, the taxonomic identity of the Bulgarian populations needs to be clarified.

A number of now-obsolete junior synonyms were formerly applied to A. schaefferi:
 Leptura schaefferi Laicharting, 1784
 Rhagium cinctum Fabricius, 1787
 Toxotus dentipes Mulsant, 1842
 Toxotus schaefferi (Laicharting, 1784)
 Acimerus schaefferi (lapsus)

References

Lepturinae
Beetles described in 1784